The 2007 Men's Oceania Cup was the fifth edition of the men's field hockey tournament. It was held from 11 to 16 September in Buderim.

The tournament served as a qualifier for the 2008 Olympic Games.

Australia won the tournament for the fifth time, defeating New Zealand 3–1 in the final.

Teams

Results
All times are local (AEST).

Preliminary round

Pool

Fixtures

Classification round

Final

Statistics

Final standings

Goalscorers

See also
2007 Women's Oceania Cup

References

Oceania Cup
Oceania Cup
Oceania Cup
International field hockey competitions hosted by Australia
Oceania Cup
2007 Oceania Cup
Buderim
Sports competitions in Queensland